Karin Rabe (born 17 February 1954) is a Swedish orienteering competitor. She is four times Relay World Champion as a member of the Swedish winning team in 1981, 1983, 1985 and 1989, as well as having silver medals from 1978 and 1987, and a bronze medal from 1979.  She obtained silver in the Individual World Championship in 1987, and bronze in 1981.

References

1954 births
Living people
Swedish orienteers
Female orienteers
Foot orienteers
World Orienteering Championships medalists